The Rocky Mount Pines was an American minor league baseball team located in Rocky Mount, North Carolina which competed in the Class A Carolina League for the 1980 season. They were the 42nd and final team to represent Rocky Mount in minor league baseball during the 20th century, beginning in 1909.

History

The 1980 Rocky Mount Pines were unaffiliated with any Major League Baseball franchise or farm system, and played their home games at Municipal Stadium. The Pines were formed by owner Lou Haneles and led by manager Mal Fichman, and represented the return of professional baseball to Rocky Mount since the departure of the Rocky Mount Phillies in 1975.

The low light of the 1980 season came on August 29 when Durham Bulls pitcher Rick Behenna no-hit the Pines in an 8-0 victory. The Pines finished their lone season with a record of only 24 wins and 114 losses, the worst mark in Carolina League history. The Pines had losing streaks of 18, 14, 13, and 11 games, and drew a total 26,702 fans for the season.  The franchise relocated the next year to Hagerstown, Maryland as the Hagerstown Suns (now the Frederick Keys).

Rocky Mount minor league history prior to 1980
Rocky Mount minor league teams played as members of the Carolina League (1962–1975; 1980), Coastal Plain League (1946–1952), Bi-State League (1942), Coastal Plain League (1941), Piedmont League (1936–1940), Eastern Carolina League (1928–1929), Piedmont League (1927), Virginia League (1915–1917; 1920–1924),  and Eastern Carolina League (1909–1910).

In addition to the Rocky Mount Phillies of 1973–1975, previous clubs were known as the Rocky Mount Senators (1964), Rocky Mount Rocks (1942; 1946), Rocky Mount Red Sox (1936–1940), Rocky Mount Buccaneers (1927–1929), Rocky Mount Broncos (1924), Rocky Mount Tar Heels (1916–1917; 1920–1923), Rocky Mount Carolinians (1915) and the original Rocky Mount Railroaders (1909–1910).

Rocky Mount teams were an affiliate of the Philadelphia Phillies (1973–1975), Detroit Tigers (1965–1972), Washington Senators (1964), Cincinnati Reds (1962–1963), Boston Red Sox (1936–1940) and Brooklyn Dodgers (1929). Rocky Mount won six league championships: in 1915, 1929, 1942, 1946, 1966 and 1975.

The ballpark
Rocky Mount teams played at Municipal Stadium. Municipal Stadium was also Known "Briles Field" (1946), "Tar Heel Park" (1920-1929), and "Briles Park" (1915). The ballpark had a capacity of 4,500 (1920), 2,800 (1923), 3,200 (1936), 3,500 (1950) and 4,500 (1971). The field dimensions were (Left, Center, Right) 350-430-350 (1923), 300-430-350 (1936) and 350-350-346 (1971). The ballpark is still in use today, hosting youth baseball. The location is South Howell Street & O'Berry Street, Rocky Mount, North Carolina.

1980 season results

Notable alumni (all 20th Century minor league teams)

Baseball Hall of Fame alumni
 Heinie Manush (1940, MGR) Inducted, 1964
Tony Pérez (1962) Inducted, 2000
 Jim Thorpe (1909-1910) Inducted Pro Football Hall of Fame, 1963

Notable alumni
Jim Bagby, Jr.
Bill Butler
Casey Cox
Jack DiLauro
Dick Drago
Al Glossop
Earl Johnson
Gene Lamont
Jim Leyland
Elliott Maddox
Lee May
Eddie Pellagrini
Johnny Pesky
Greg Pryor
Leon Roberts
Jim Rooker
Vern Ruhle
Stan Spence
Bobby Thomson
César Tovar
Bill Voiselle
Charlie Wagner

See also
Rocky Mount Phillies

References

Rocky Mount, North Carolina
Defunct Carolina League teams
Professional baseball teams in North Carolina
Carolina League teams
Brooklyn Dodgers minor league affiliates
Boston Red Sox minor league affiliates
Cincinnati Reds minor league affiliates
Washington Senators (1961–1971) minor league affiliates
Detroit Tigers minor league affiliates
1980 disestablishments in North Carolina
Sports clubs disestablished in 1980
1909 establishments in North Carolina
Baseball teams established in 1909
Defunct baseball teams in North Carolina